Fassina is an Italian surname. Notable people with this surname include:

 Antonio Fassina (born 1945), Italian rally driver
 Jean Fassina (born 1936), French classical pianist
 Kaity Fassina (born 1990), Australian weightlifter
 Neil Fassina, Canadian academic
 Stefano Fassina (born 1966), Italian politician

Italian-language surnames